Geoffrey Wilder is a fictional supervillain in the Marvel Comics series Runaways. Geoffrey is the leader of the Pride, a supervillain crime ring in Los Angeles. He is the father of Alex Wilder.

Geoffrey Wilder was played by Ryan Sands in the Hulu TV series Runaways set in the Marvel Cinematic Universe. He is considered a father who is just trying to protect his family by doing heinous tasks.

Publication history
Geoffrey Wilder first appeared in Runaways #1 and was created by Brian K. Vaughan and Adrian Alphona.

Fictional character biography
Geoffrey Wilder and his recent bride Catherine were lowly thieves in 1984 Los Angeles. After a heist, they were abducted by the Gibborim, a group of giants who needed them to bring their plan to fruition. Along with five other couples, the Wilders formed the Pride, which was a group dedicated to bringing about the end of the world for the Gibborim. Each couple had their unique powers augmented by the Gibborim, meaning that Geoffrey and Catherine's shrewdness was increased, allowing them to become the Kingpins of the West Coast. They controlled drugs and prostitution in LA as well as controlling the Pride's moles in various police forces. The Gibborim also promised that 6 of the 12 members of the Pride would be saved after the world ended. However, a few years later, the couples decided to each have a single child and have their children be saved.

Nearly two decades later, Geoffrey's son Alex began to get suspicious of his parents' activities. Geoffrey was a strict father to Alex, looking down on his obsession with internet games and computer skills. This may have been responsible for driving Alex to spying on his parents and learning of the Pride. This act led to the creation of the Runaways.

While the children of the Pride were on the run, Geoffrey and the other members of the Pride organized the LAPD to find their children by framing them for the death of a girl killed by the Pride as well as the kidnapping of Molly Hayes, one of the children of the Pride.

Eventually, the Runaways and the Pride met in a final showdown in an undersea structure. The Runaways were able to stop the Pride's plan to offer a sacrifice to the Gibborim, which led to the death of Alex Wilder, who had turned out to be loyal to the Pride. The death of his son left Geoffrey distraught in his last few moments alive, as the Gibborim went on to destroy the structure, killing the entire Pride just after the Runaways made their getaway.

1985 version
A few months later, a few of Alex's friends from his online gaming found out about Alex's death as well as some files from Alex's computer. The files talked about how the Pride was a group of heroes (as opposed to villains as reported by The Daily Bugle), and had a ritual detailing how to bring Alex back.  However, when the people performed the spell, they brought Geoff back by accident. The Geoff they raised from the dead is the 1985 version, as he mentions that he was only with the Pride for a year. Geoffrey reformed the Pride using Alex's friends as the other members, planning to use them to regain favor with the Gibborim by sacrificing one of the Runaways (a plot the other members of the new Pride were unaware of). It is revealed that Geoffrey was upset to learn of the future death of his wife and son and wanted the Gibborim to resurrect them.  During this period, he temporarily posed as the mutant Chamber to infiltrate the super-team Excelsior and get information on the Runaways, before leaving the team.

Wilder is eventually stopped by the Runaways, but manages to impale and kill Gertrude Yorkes. The Runaways then erase his memory from his time in 2006, and send him back to 1985. It is then revealed he lost his Abstract ring, and that Chase Stein has gained it.

Other versions

Ultimate Marvel
In the Ultimate Marvel universe, Geoffrey Wilder is the attorney general of the United States working under President Steve Rogers.

In other media
Geoffrey Wilder appears in the Hulu TV series adaptation of Runaways, portrayed by Ryan Sands. Geoffrey has a better relationship with his son and tries to connect with him. Though he is still involved with the Pride, his wife Catherine appears to be the more dominant of the two. He is depicted as being the most reluctant to follow through with sacrificing Destiny Gonzalez even saying "I'm sorry" to her when she realizes what is happening. His background is explored with him once having been part of a gang with his crew mate Darius Davis (played by DeVaughn Nixon). While in prison, Geoffrey was approached by a mysterious man named Jonah (played by Julian McMahon). With guidance from Catherine, who at the time was his lawyer, Geoffrey opts to enter the realtor business and convinces Darius to take the blame for shooting a man. In return, Geoffrey would take care of his family. However, in the present day, Geoffrey does not keep up his end of the bargain and Darius is left out in the cold upon his own release from prison. He attempts to extort money from him, but is thwarted with a threat to his aunt. Geoffrey is forced to act when his son, Alex, is kidnapped and held ransom by Darius. Geoffrey gets Lieutenant Flores to send some men to help him. During the gun fight, Darius' right-hand man Andre is shot and Geoffrey decides to use him for the Pride's next sacrifice to energize Jonah. His relationship with Alex begins to fall apart. Geoffrey's construction company is revealed to really be digging for an unknown substance hidden under Los Angeles. He along with Catherine and the rest of the Pride are later informed by Jonah, who learns through Frank Dean, that their kids are fully aware of their activities. He and the Pride attempt to stop their kids from destroying everything they have built towards. Geoffrey and Catherine soon become concerned for Alex's well-being when Jonah threatens him and the other Pride members' kids. They attempt to speak with a captured Karolina about the whereabouts of Alex, but are stopped by Jonah. Fed up with everything, Geoffrey and Catherine decide to look for Alex themselves.

References

External links
 Geoffrey Wilder at Marvel Wiki
 Geoffrey Wilder at Comic Vine

Comics characters introduced in 2003
Fictional African-American people
Fictional characters from Los Angeles
Fictional crime bosses
Marvel Comics supervillains
Characters created by Brian K. Vaughan